The men's foil was one of eight fencing events on the fencing at the 1992 Summer Olympics programme. It was the twenty-first appearance of the event. The competition was held on 31 July 1992. 59 fencers from 25 nations competed. Nations had been limited to three fencers each since 1928. The event was won by Philippe Omnès of France, the nation's first victory in the men's foil since 1956 and eighth overall (passing Italy for most all-time). Serhiy Holubytskiy of the Unified Team took silver. Elvis Gregory earned Cuba's first medal in the event in 88 years with his bronze.

Background

This was the 21st appearance of the event, which has been held at every Summer Olympics except 1908 (when there was a foil display only rather than a medal event). Five of the eight quarterfinalists from 1988 returned: gold medalist (and 1984 bronze medalist) Stefano Cerioni of Italy, silver medalist Udo Wagner of East Germany, fourth-place finisher Ulrich Schreck of West Germany, and fifth-place finishers Zsolt Érsek of Hungary and Mauro Numa (also the 1984 gold medalist) of Italy. Philippe Omnès of France had been a quarterfinalist in 1984 but had been defeated earlier in 1988; he medaled at all three of the world championships between the Seoul and Barcelona Games, including winning in 1990.

The Philippines and Singapore each made their debut in the men's foil; some former Soviet republics competed as the Unified Team. France and the United States each made their 19th appearance, tied for most of any nation; France had missed only the 1904 (with fencers not traveling to St. Louis) and the 1912 (boycotted due to a dispute over rules) foil competitions, while the United States had missed the inaugural 1896 competition and boycotted the 1980 Games altogether.

Competition format

The 1992 tournament used a three-phase format roughly similar to prior years in consisting of a group phase, a double-elimination phase, and a single-elimination phase, but each phase was very different from previous formats.

The first phase was a single round (vs. 3 rounds in 1988) round-robin pool play format; each fencer in a pool faced each other fencer in that pool once. There were 9 pools with 6 or 7 fencers each. The fencers' ranks within the pool were ignored; the overall winning percentage (with touch differential and then touches against used as tie-breakers) were used to rank the fencers. The top 46 advanced to the second phase, while the other fencers were eliminated.

The second phase was a modified, truncated double-elimination tournament. 14 fencers received a bye to the second round (round of 32), while the 32 fencers ranked 15–46 played in the round of 64. Fencers losing in the round of 64 were eliminated, while the remaining rounds were double elimination via repechages. The repechages (but not the main brackets) used a complicated reseeding mechanism. Ultimately, the 4 fencers remaining undefeated after the round of 8 advanced to the quarterfinals along with 4 fencers who advanced through the repechages after one loss.

The final phase was a single elimination tournament with quarterfinals, semifinals, and a final and bronze medal match.

All bouts were to 5 touches. In the second and third phases, matches were best-of-three bouts.

Schedule

All times are Central European Summer Time (UTC+2)

Results

Group round

Fencers were ranked by win percent, then touch differential, then touches against. This ranking, with adjustments to ensure that no two fencers of the same nation were in the same bracket (noted in parentheses), was used to seed the elimination round brackets.

Elimination rounds

Main brackets

Main bracket 1

Bravin, Giasson, and Abe were eliminated after the round of 64. The losers in the round of 32 faced off, with Lo beating Wagner and Gosbee beating Abe to advance to the repechage. The losers of the round of 16, Cerioni and Holubytskiy, advanced directly to the first round of the repechage. Gregory, having lost in the round of 8, went to the third round of the repechage. Sypniewski won the bracket, advancing to the quarterfinals.

Repechage qualifiers 1

Main bracket 2 

Guerra, Longenbach, Wang L., and Kim were eliminated after the round of 64. The losers in the round of 32 faced off, with O. García beating Busa and Davis beating Ludwig to advance to the repechage. The losers of the round of 16, Schreck and Grigoryev, advanced directly to the first round of the repechage. Omnès, having lost in the round of 8, went to the third round of the repechage. Borella won the bracket, advancing to the quarterfinals.

Repechage qualifiers 2

Main bracket 3 

Abdallah, Ichigatani, Krzesiński, and Wu were eliminated after the round of 64. The losers in the round of 32 faced off, with A. García beating Wang H. and Groc beating Bravo to advance to the repechage. The losers of the round of 16, Shevchenko and Érsek, advanced directly to the first round of the repechage. Numa, having lost in the round of 8, went to the third round of the repechage. Wendt won the bracket, advancing to the quarterfinals.

Repechage qualifiers 3

Main bracket 4 

Marx, Lhôtellier, and Kiss were eliminated after the round of 64. The losers in the round of 32 faced off, with Nagano beating McKenzie and Ye beating Weidner to advance to the repechage. The losers of the round of 16, Kiełpikowski and Richter, advanced directly to the first round of the repechage. Kajbjer, having lost in the round of 8, went to the third round of the repechage. Betancourt won the bracket, advancing to the quarterfinals.

Repechage qualifiers 4

Repechage rounds 1 and 2 

The fencers were reseeded: the eight fencers who had lost in the round of 16 were reseeded as 1–8 while the eight fencers who had lost in the round of 32 but won the repechage qualifiers were reseeded as 9–16. For example, original seed #2 Ye was reseeded as #9 because he was the top-seeded fencer who had advanced through the repechage qualifiers. Original seeds are shown in parentheses in the brackets.

Repechage rounds 1 and 2 bracket 1 

García faced the top two fencers from the group round, beating Cerioni before falling to Ye.

Repechage rounds 1 and 2 bracket 2

Repechage rounds 1 and 2 bracket 3

Repechage rounds 1 and 2 bracket 4

Repechage round 3 

The fencers were reseeded again. Seeds 1–4 were given to round 8 losers, based on their original seeds. Seeds 5–8 were given to the winners of the second round of the repechage, based on their original seeds—except that Ye was moved from #5 to #6 to avoid a rematch with Kajbjer.

Repechage round 3 bracket 1

Repechage round 3 bracket 2

Repechage round 3 bracket 3

Repechage round 3 bracket 4

Final rounds

The fencers were reseeded a final time. Seeds 1–4 were given to the round of 8 winners, based on their original seeds. Seeds 5–8 were given to the winners of the third round of the repechage, based on their original seeds.

Final classification

References

Foil men
Men's events at the 1992 Summer Olympics